Michael Adebayo Oluwarohunbi is an Anglican bishop in Nigeria.

Oluwarohunbi was educated at the University of Ilorin. He worked for the Department of Engineering in Abuja before his call to ministry.

He was the Supervising Priest of the Cathedral Church of Abuja and General Secretary of the Church of Nigeria Anglican Communion before in 2014 he became Bishop of Yewa.

Notes

Living people
Anglican bishops of Yewa
21st-century Anglican bishops in Nigeria
University of Ilorin alumni
1959 births
People from Imo State
Trinity Theological College, Umuahia alumni
Church of Nigeria archdeacons